Dean Julian Kenny (born 22 May 1961) is a former New Zealand rugby union player. A halfback, Kenny represented Otago at a provincial level, and was a member of the New Zealand national side, the All Blacks, in 1986. He played three matches for the All Blacks on their tour of France that year, but did not play in any tests.

Dean Kenny qualified as a chiropractor but lost his registration in 2018 after facing charges in the North Shore District Court. These charges relating to false treatment claims made to ACC between March and July 2016.

References

1961 births
Living people
People from Woodville, New Zealand
People educated at Palmerston North Boys' High School
New Zealand rugby union players
New Zealand international rugby union players
Otago rugby union players
Sale Sharks players
Rugby union scrum-halves
Māori All Blacks players
Palmer College of Chiropractic alumni
New Zealand chiropractors
Rugby union players from Manawatū-Whanganui